Wallace T. MacCaffrey (1920-2013) was Professor Emeritus of History at Harvard University.   He was a graduate of 
Reed College and Harvard University.  He also taught at the University of California, Los Angeles and Haverford College.  Among his awards is a Guggenheim fellowship.  He was a leading scholar of Elizabethan England, best known for his trilogy of books, The Shaping of the Elizabethan Regime (1968), Queen Elizabeth and the Making of Policy, 1572-1588 (1981) and Elizabeth I: War and Politics, 1588-1603 (1992).

He died, aged 93, on 13 December 2013 at Addenbrooke's Hospital, Cambridge, following a short illness and is buried at St Andrew's church, Girton.

Chairmanships at Harvard
MacCaffrey served as the Harvard History chair twice, and presided over a period of turmoil in the department.

Reed donation
He gave Reed College a $1 million donation in 2006.

References 

Reed College alumni
Harvard University faculty
Historians of the British Isles
American historians
Harvard University alumni
People from Girton, Cambridgeshire
1920 births
2013 deaths